Fissurella microtrema, common name the rugose slit limpet,  is a species of sea snail, a marine gastropod mollusk in the family Fissurellidae, the keyhole limpets and slit limpets.

Description
The size of the shell varies between 15 mm and 27 mm.

Distribution
This species occurs in the Pacific Ocean from Southern Baja California, Mexico, to Peru.

References

External links
 To Biodiversity Heritage Library (19 publications)
 To USNM Invertebrate Zoology Mollusca Collection
 To ITIS
 To World Register of Marine Species
 

Fissurellidae
Gastropods described in 1835